Scenic may refer to:
 Scenic design
 Scenic painting
 Scenic overlook
 Scenic railroad (disambiguation)
 Scenic route
 Scenic, South Dakota, United States
 Scenic (horse), a Thoroughbred racehorse

Aviation
Airwave Scenic, an Austrian paraglider design

Companies and organizations
 Scenic Airlines
 Scenic America, nonprofit advocacy organization
 United Scenic Artists, United States labor union
 Woodland Scenics, manufacturer of model railroad scenic materials

Music
 The Scenics, band
 Scenic (album), 2004 album by band Denver Harbor

Vehicles
 Scenic Daylight, defunct express train in New Zealand
 Renault Scénic, a compact MPV automobile produced by French automaker Renault
 Tranz Scenic, passenger train in New Zealand

See also
 
 
 
 
 
 Scenic Drive (disambiguation)
 List of scenic trails
 Scene (disambiguation)
 Scenery (disambiguation)